Paula Reimers is an American rabbi. In 2008 she was the rabbi of Congregation Beth Israel (Lebanon, Pennsylvania), however, as of January 2017 she is no longer listed as that Congregation's rabbi. Reimers is one of the first women to be ordained by the Conservative movement’s  Jewish Theological Seminary of America.

Biography
Reimers was educated at Barnard College, (A.B., 1969)  M.A., Columbia University, (M.A., 1971) and the Jewish Theological Seminary of America (M.A., ordination, 1990.) 
Reimers converted from Christianity to Judaism in 1981.

Reimers has been politically active in defense of Palestinian rights. In 2001, shortly after the  9/11 attacks, Reimers invited several Muslims to join members of Burbank Temple Emanu-El in Burbank, California in their sukkah. In order not to offend the Muslim guests, Israeli flags were removed from among the sukkah decorations, offending some of her congregants.  The congregation voted not to renew her contract.

As of July 2015, Reimers was on the Rabbinical Council of the group Jewish Voice for Peace, a group the ADL has called one of the top 10 anti-Israel groups in the country. However as of June 2018, she was no longer listed on that Council.

Reimers,  a feminist, opposes using both male and female pronouns in worship.

Reimers spoke out against the Christian missionizing of Ralph Drollinger the former NBA player who now heads Capitol Ministries  whose goal is: "Making disciples for Jesus Christ in state legislatures." Reimers further elaborated that:

In my opinion, the 2007 Commonwealth Prayer Breakfast clearly showed state endorsement of one particular religion (Christianity) and one particular sect within that religion (evangelical Protestantism), and even one particular Christian evangelical organization, Capitol Ministries. Many specific indications would lead to this conclusion.

Publications
 "Feminism, Judaism, and God the Mother" (Conservative Judaism, Fall 1993)

References

Living people
Converts to Conservative Judaism
Converts to Judaism from Christianity
American Conservative rabbis
American feminists
Columbia University alumni
Barnard College alumni
Jewish feminists
Jewish Theological Seminary of America semikhah recipients
Conservative women rabbis
Year of birth missing (living people)
20th-century American rabbis
21st-century American rabbis
Palestinian solidarity activists